The Diocese of Nuevo Laredo is a Latin Church ecclesiastical territory or diocese of the Catholic Church in Nuevo Laredo, Tamaulipas, Mexico. It is a suffragan in the ecclesiastical province of the metropolitan Archdiocese of Monterrey. It covers an area of 7,484 Square Miles (19,378 square kilometers) and serves 980,000 inhabitants of which 86 percent are Catholic. The Diocese of Nuevo Laredo was erected on November 6, 1989 under the papal bull "quo Facilius." The current Bishop of Nuevo Laredo is Enrique Sanchez Martinez, who before coming to Nuevo Laredo in 2015 was the auxiliary bishop in the Diocese of Durango. His predecessor, Gustavo Rodriguez Vega, was called away from the diocese by Pope Francis to serve as 
Archbishop of Yucatán, which Archdiocese is based in Mérida.

Bishops
Ricardo Watty Urquidi, M.Sp.S. (1989–2008), appointed Bishop of Tepic, Nayarit
Gustavo Rodríguez Vega (2008-2015), appointed Archbishop of Yucatán 
Enrique Sanchez Martinez (2015- )

External links and references

References

Nuevo Laredo
Nuevo Laredo
Nuevo Laredo, Roman Catholic Diocese of
Nuevo Laredo
Nuevo Laredo